The 2009 FIFA World Player of the Year awards took place on 21 December 2009 at the Kongresshaus Zürich, Zürich, Switzerland. Shortlists of 23 men and 10 women were announced on 30 October 2009. The final five contenders for this year's FIFA World Player of the Year and FIFA Women's World Player of the Year awards were announced on 7 December 2009. Lionel Messi was announced as the World Player of the Year with a record points total.

Results

Men

Women

Shortlist of 10 players
 Nadine Angerer
 Sonia Bompastor
 Cristiane
 Inka Grings
 Mana Iwabuchi
 Simone Laudehr
 Marta
 Birgit Prinz
 Kelly Smith
 Abby Wambach

References

2009 in association football
2009